This is a list of television stations in Africa. Many African countries have various television stations both public and private in nature. The management of these stations vary across countries. In some parts of Africa, radio is a more common form of news and media, see the list of radio stations in Africa for more information.

African Great Lakes

Burundi 
 Burundi National Radio and Television
 BeTV
 Télé Renaissance

Kenya

Free to air DVB-T2 channels

 Citizen TV (Royal Media Company aka RMS) 
 Sayare TV
 Kenya Broadcasting Corporation 
 Kenya Television Network (2 channels KTN HOME and KTN NEWS) 
 NTV 
 TV47 (Cape Media Ltd)
 K24 TV (Kenya - a Mediamax owned Company)
 Inooro TV (Vernacular Broadcast-kikuyu) - A Royal Media company
 PPP TV & TRIPLE P TV (Music and Entertainment from Both Local, Regional and International Markets)
 Y254 Television (Youth Entertainment TV a subsidiary of KBC)
 Ebru Television (Kenya) (https://ebru.tv/)
 Farmers TV (Farming Based Content Broadcasting)
 Njata Television (Rift Valley Based Vernacular Television - Kikuyu)
 KASS TV (Local Vernacular Television Station - Kalenjin)
 Bunge TV (Parliamentary Proceedings Live-Broadcast)
 Senate TV (Senate Proceedings Live-Broadcast)
 FAMILY TV (Oldest Dedicated Christian Gospel Television) (http://familymedia.tv/) 
 Dove TV (Gospel TV)
 Heritage TV (Kenya's First History Channel - A KBC Company)
 KISS TV (Music and Entertainment from Both Local, Regional and International Markets)
 KAABA TV (Dedicated Islamia Channel)
 Star TV (Somali Speaking Target Market)
 Look Up TV
 Utana TV
 Gikuyu TV
 Weru TV
 Mwangaza TV
 Ziwa TV
 STN
 RTN TV

Tanzania 
 Tanzania Broadcasting Television (TBC)
 Zanzibar Broadcasting Corporation (ZBC)
Independent Television (ITV)
East African Television (EATV)
Star TV
UTV
Clouds TV
Al Itrah Broadcasting Network Television (IBNTV)

Uganda 
 Uganda Broadcasting Corporation (UBC) 
 Lighthouse Television Uganda (LTV) First Christian based content Television in Uganda. (Trinity Broadcasting Network affiliate)
 Break Through Media (BTM TV)
 NBS Television (Next Media Services)
 NTV Uganda (Nation Media Group)
 Bukedde TV (1 & 2)
 BBS Terefayina
 SEE TV
 Baba Television
 TV West
 TV East
 Urban TV
 Wan Luo TV

Rwanda 
 Rwanda Television (RTV)
 TV7
 Kwesé Free Sports
 Contact TV
 TV1
 Goodrich TV
 Flash TV
 Big Television Network (BTN) TV
 Rwanda Television (RTV)
 Authentic TV
 Isango Star TV
 TV10
 Victory TV

South Sudan 
 South Sudan Broadcasting Corporation

Central Africa

Cameroon 
 CRTV
 Canal 2 International
 Équinoxe TV
 Spectrum Television
 Vision4 Television
 Danpullo Broadcasting System
 LTM TV
 CAM 10 Télévision
 Dash TV News
 Dash TV Sport & Entertainment
 Bnews1

Central African Republic 

 Télévision Centrafricaine
 Central African Republic Communications
 DTV

Chad 
 Télé Tchad
 Electron TV
 Tchad 24

Republic of the Congo and Democratic Republic of Congo 

 CMB Digi
 RTNC
 Antenne A
 Canal Kin Télévision
 Canal Congo Télévision
 Digital Congo TV
 Télé50
 Numerica TV
 B-one Télévision
 Télé Congo
 DRTV International

Equatorial Guinea 
 TVGE
 Asonga Televisión

Gabon 

 RTG
 Kanal 7
 Nour TV
 Label TV
 TV+

São Tomé and Príncipe 

 RTP África
 TVS-Televisao Santomense
 RTP Internacional

Horn of Africa

Djibouti 

 Radio Television of Djibouti
 Horn Cable Television.
 Sahal Cable TV
 Star Ocean Television.

Eritrea 

 Eri-TV

Ethiopia 

 Ethiopian Broadcasting Corporation
 ETV (Ethiopia) News HD
ETV entertainment HD
 ETV Language HD
ETV Sports UHD
 ETV East HD
 ETV West HD
 ETV South HD
 ETV North HD
 ETV Representative HD
AHADU TELEVISION
EBS 4K
EBS cinema HD
EBS Muskia HD
Nahoo TV
ARTS TV HD
Fana TV
Walta TV
DW TV HD
New Africa TV
ESAT
Oromia Media Network
Oromia News Network
JTV Ethiopia
 LTV
 OBN
Amhara Media Corporation
 Addis Media Network
 Tigrai TV
 Harari Television
 Somali Region Television
 Debub TV
 Asham TV
 Sidama Media Network
 Tigrai Media House
 Nabad TV
 Finfinnee integrated Broadcasting (FiB)

Somalia 

 Eastern Television Network.
 Horn Cable Television.

 Shabelle TV.

 Somalia National Television.
 Universal Television.

 Jubbaland TV.

 Dalka TV.
 Puntland TV.

 Kalsann TV.
 Goobjoog TV.

Somaliland 
 SLNTV

 Somali Cable TV.
 Five Somali TV.
 Xoogmaal Media

Indian Ocean islands

Comoros 
 ORTC

Madagascar 
 TVM
 RTA
 Real TV
 Kolo TV
 MATV
 MBS
 Viva Madagascar
 TV Plus
 Dream'in TV
 i-BC TV
 AZ Radio Television
 Amitié Télévision

Mauritius 
 Mauritius Broadcasting Corporation
 TéléPlus
 TOP TV

Seychelles 
 Seychelles Broadcasting Corporation
 TéléSesel

North Africa

Algeria 

 Dzair News
 Dzair TV 
 Echourouk News 
 Echourouk TV 
 El Heddaf TV
 El Watan Al Djazairia
 Ennahar TV
 Hogar TV 
 KBC TV

 ENTV
 Algérie 3
 Canal Algérie - in French
 Coran TV 5

Egypt 
 ERTU
 CBC
 CBC DRAMA TV
 CBC EXTRA
 Mehwar TV
 Al-Nahar TV
 Al Nahar Drama
 Al Nahar Cinema
 Nile TV International
 Dream TV
 Al Qahera News
 TeN TV
 DMC
 DMC Drama
 DMC SPORTS
 ON E
 ON sport
 ON Drama
 Sada Elbalad
 Sada El Balad 2
 Sada El Balad Drama
 Extra News
 Free TV
 Mazzika
 Mazzika Zoom
 Melody Aflam

Libya 
 Al-Jamahiriya TV
 Libya Al-Ahrar
 Libya Febrayer TV
 Libya's Channel
 Libya Mostakbal
 Wasat TV
 218TV
 Tanasoh TV
 Libya Panorama Channel (LPC)
 Libya Rsmia

Morocco 

 2M TV
 2M Monde
 Aflam TV
 Al Aoula
 Al Aoula Europe
 Al Aoula Middle East
 Al Maghribia
 Arrabia
 Arryadia
 Arryadia 2
 Arryadia TNT
 Assadissa
 Laayoune TV
 Medi 1 TV Maghreb
 Medi 1 TV Arabic
 Medi 1 TV Afrique
 Tamazight TV
 CHADATV
 Télé Maroc
 Canal Atlas
 M24

Sahrawi Arab Democratic Republic 
 RASD TV

Sudan 

 Sudan TV
 Blue Nile TV

Tunisia 

 Hannibal TV
 Nessma El Jadida
 Attessia TV
 Telvza TV
 El Watania 2
 El Watania 1

Southern Africa

Angola 

 Palanca TV
 RTP África
 TPA
 TV Zimbo
 RTP Internacional

Botswana 

AccessTV
 BTV
BTV
BTV 2
BTV 3
BTV 4
 Now Channel (formerly known as Now TV)
 YTV (formerly known as eBotswana)
Hub TV
Khuduga HD
Maru TV

Eswatini 
 Eswatini TV

Lesotho 
 Lesotho National Broadcasting Service

Malawi 
 Malawi Broadcasting Corporation
 Times Television
 Zodiak TV
 Mibawa Television
 Great Dominion Television
 Rainbow Television

Mozambique 

 TVM
 STV
 STV Notícias
 TV Sucesso
 TV Miramar
 TOP TV
 Media Mais TV
 EcoTV
 RTP Internacional (Only in cable, satellite and IPTV)
 RTP Africa

Namibia 

 Namibian Broadcasting Corporation

 One Africa Television

South Africa 

 7 Africa Television Network
7africatvnetwork. 
(First christian culture television network in the World- Live from South Africa CAT)
 Mpuma Kapa TV
 Tshwane TV
 Cape Town TV
 e.tv 
 M-Net
 MYtv, formerly ASTV
 Newzroom Afrika
 Nongoma TV
 South African Broadcasting Corporation
 Soweto TV

www.7africatvnetwork.com

Zambia 
Zambia has television stations both public and private in nature. Private stations are run by various individuals and organizations. Some organization are religious organization.

 African Agri-Business Network (ABN) - Lusaka
 Catholic Television - Lusaka
 Central Africa Media Network (CAMNET) - Lusaka
 Chipata Television - Chipata
 City Television - Lusaka
 Copperbelt Television - Ndola
 Covenant Broadcasting Company (CBC) - Lusaka - CBC 1, CBC 2, CBC 3, CBC 4.
 Crown Television - Lusaka
 Diamond TV - Lusaka
 Fresh Television - Lusaka
 Hope Television - Lusaka
 KBN TV (Kenmark Broadcasting Network) - Lusaka
 KNC Television - Kabwe
 Kopala Television - Kitwe
 Life TV - Lusaka
 Mozo Television - Lusaka
 Muvi Television - Lusaka
 North West Television - Solwezi
 Power Television - Lusaka
 Prime Television - Lusaka
 Revelation Television - Lusaka
 Spring24 TV - Lusaka
 Trinity Broadcasting Network (TBN) - TBN 1, TBN 2.
 Q Television - Lusaka
 Zambia National Broadcasting Corporation (ZNBC) - Lusaka - ZNBC TV 1, ZNBC TV 2, ZNBC TV3.
 Zed TV - Lusaka

Zimbabwe 

 1st TV (defunct)
 3Ktv (started broadcasting from 28 February 2022)
 Channel D (started broadcasting from Q1 2023)
 KeYona TV (started broadcasting from 24 November 2022 and launched on 17 December 2022)
 Kumba TV (started broadcasting from Q1 2023)
 NRTV (started broadcasting from 11 August 2022 and launched on 1 February 2023)
 ZBC TV
 ZTN Prime (started broadcasting from 24 May 2022)

West Africa

Benin 
 ORTB
 Eden TV
 Canal 3
 TV Carrefour
 Golfe TV Africa
 E-Télé

Burkina Faso 
 RTB
 BF1
 3TV
 Canal3
 Télévision Omega
 Savane TV
 TV Al Houda
 LCA TV
 TVZ Africa
 Burkina Info TV

Cape Verde 

 RTC
 TIVER
 RecordTV Cabo Verde
 RTP África
 RTP Internacional (Only on satellite)

Côte d'Ivoire 

 Radio Télévision Ivoirienne
 Life TV
 La Nouvelle Chaine Ivoirienne

Gambia 

 GRTS
 Eye Africa TV
 Eye Africa TV 2
 Banjul TV
 QTV Gambia
 Paradise TV
 Star TV
 DSTV Gambia

Ghana 

 Adom TV
 Atinka TV
 Citi TV
 e.tv Ghana
 GHOne TV
 Ghana Broadcasting Corporation 
 GTV
 Joy News
 Kessben TV
 Metro TV 
 Multi TV 
 NET 2 Television 
 TOP TV
 TV Africa 
 TV3 
 Viasat 1 
 UTV Ghana
 Ewenyigba TV

Guinea 
 Radio Télévision Guinéenne
 Espace TV
 Star21 TV
 Kaback TV

Guinea Bissau 

 Guinea-Bissau Television
 RTP África
 RTP Internacional (Only In Cable, satellite and IPTV)

Liberia 
 LNTV
 Power TV

Mali 

 Office de Radiodiffusion Television du Mali (ORTM)
 TM2
 Africable
 Liberté Télévision
 TM1 
 M7 TV
 Mousso TV
 9TV 
 Renouveau TV
 Nieta TV
 Bèlèdougou TV
 Alafia TV

Mauritania 
 TV de Mauritanie
 Elmourabiton TV
 Sahel TV

Niger 
 ORTN
 Bonferey
 Canal 3 Niger
 Dounia TV
 Niger24 TV
 Radio-Télévision Ténéré
 Tambara TV
 Tauraruwa TV
 Radio Television Labari

Nigeria 

 Channels TV
 Emmanuel TV
 Galaxy Television
 Lagos Television
 Nigerian Television Authority
 Orient TV
 Rivers State Television
 Silverbird Television
 Soundcity TV
 TVC News
 Rahma TV
 ITV Benin
 AIT
 EBS
 Rave TV
 Borno Radio Television BRTV
 Al-Ansar Radio and TV
 Arewa 24
 Africa Magic
 AKBC
 Arise News
 DBN TV
 1TV Network
 Heriatge Global Academy Tv 
 Galaxy TV
 KAFTAN TV
 Koga TV
 Lagos Television
 Minaj Systems Tv Obosi
 Minaj Broadcast Network Obosi
 Minaj Broadcasting International (MBI)
 Murhi International Television (MITV)
 News Central Media
 Odenigbo FM Obosi Anambra state
 Ogun State Television
 Ondo State Radiovision Corporation
 Plus TV Africa
 Trust TV
 TVC Entertainment
 WAP TV
 Wazobia TV

Senegal 

 2sTV
 RTS
 TFM
 SenTV
 Walf TV
 Label TV
 RDV
 DTV
 7TV
 Africa7
 iTV
 Leral TV

Sierra Leone 
 SLBC
 Star TV

Togo 

 Télévision Togolaises
 TV2

See also

 List of radio stations in Africa
 List of Berber-language television channels

References

External links
 

Africa
 Television, list
Africa-related lists